Frank Wolcott (1840–1910) was an officer in the Union Army, a law man and a rancher.

Biography

Early life
Wolcott was born December 13, 1840 in Canandaigua, New York.  He served in the Union Army in the Civil War, and was promoted to the rank of major before being discharged in 1866. He then attempted to work for the U.S. Land Office in Kentucky, but left for Wyoming only a few years later for a position as a U.S. Marshal.

Johnson County War
In Wyoming, Wolcott purchased a ranch near Deer Creek and joined the Wyoming Stock Growers Association.  Working for the WSGA he became involved in the Johnson County War.  Leading a small band of Regulators that terrorized and killed small ranchers who were obstructing the WSGA's goal of greater consolidation and an end to free ranging. These ranchers were accused of cattle rustling.  The book History of Wyoming by T. A. Larson credits this plan directly to Wolcott, other sources disagree and trace the "lynching bee" to WSGA board members.

After the murder of Nate Champion the Sheriff of Johnson County hunted down the Regulators at The TA Ranch Ranch near Crazy Woman Creek. The Governor of Wyoming requested the assistance of federal troops from President Benjamin Harrison. So with the aid of the 6th Cavalry they were forced to surrender, and were brought in to Fort McKinney. But due to the influence of the WSGA both Wolcott and his Regulators were set free without charge.

Later life
Wolcott became a Justice of the Peace March 39, 1890, with a reputation for harsh sentencing.  Four years later he became an agent for the Omaha Stockyards. He died in 1910 in Denver, Colorado.

External links
short lawman bio
Spartacus bio
Wolcotts role in the Johnson Country War

References

1840 births
1910 deaths
Cowboys
Union Army officers
United States Marshals
American justices of the peace
American cattlemen
People from Canandaigua, New York
People from Johnson County, Wyoming
People of the American Old West
19th-century American judges